Hemimacquartia paradoxa is a European species of fly in the family Tachinidae.

References

Insects described in 1893
Diptera of Europe
Exoristinae
Taxa named by Friedrich Moritz Brauer
Taxa named by Julius von Bergenstamm